Blitz House is an anarchist, communist and socialist self-managed social centre in Oslo, Norway, founded in 1982. Having started as a squat, it is now legalized and based on Pilestredet. The centre hosts activities such as political meetings, a feminist radio station (radiOrakel), a vegan café and practice rooms for musicians.

The house 

The Blitz House is a self-managed social centre in Oslo, Norway. It started out as a squatted building in Skippergata 6 in downtown Oslo in 1982 and has since been a centre of socialist, communist and anarchist activism. 

In 1982, Skippergata was evicted and the squatters moved into Pilestredet 30c in central Oslo, where an agreement was made with the city. They were allowed to rent the house for a symbolic rent, and in return they would maintain the building. In 2002, the city council, led by the Conservative Party, put the Blitz house on sale. The activists responded with protests and battered the entrance of the Oslo City Hall, and the sale was stopped. The Christian Democratic Party (KrF) criticised the group and attempted to stop the lease.

Among the activities of the house are a feminist radio station (radiOrakel), a vegan café, a concert hall, practice rooms for musicians and bookshop and infoshop. Alongside Hausmania in Oslo and UFFA in Trondheim, Blitz is a centre for anarchism in Norway.

Protests 
During the 1980s, the people around Blitz were involved in many protests for example during the visits of the British prime minister Margaret Thatcher in 1986 and US Secretary of Defense Caspar Weinberger in 1987. The demonstrations turned into street battles between Blitz sympathisers and the police. From the 1990s onwards, Blitz has often obstructed legal meetings of right-wing political parties such as the Progress Party, the minor Fatherland Party and the Democrats. 

The house was bombed by neo-Nazis in 1990 and 1994.
Mayhem bassist Varg Vikernes allegedly planned to blow up the Blitz House and had stockpiled 150 kg of explosives and 3,000 rounds of ammunition at the time of his arrest for the murder of bandmate Euronymous in 1993. Blitz openly supported and took part in the 2008–09 Oslo riots.

See also 
 Squatting in Norway
 Ungdomshuset, a similar project in Denmark

References

External links 
 Official site

1980s in Oslo
1982 establishments in Norway
20th century in Oslo
Anarchist communities
Anarchism in Norway
Autonomism
Far-left politics
Former squats
Infoshops
Politics of Norway
Vegan restaurants
Squatting in Norway